William Sanford may refer to:
 William Eli Sanford (1838–1899), Canadian businessman, philanthropist, and politician
 William Ayshford Sanford (1818–1902), Australian landowner, naturalist and politician
 William Taylor Barnes Sanford (1814–1863), American road builder and member of the Los Angeles council

See also
 William Sandford (1841–1932), English-Australian ironmaster
 William Sandford (colonist) (1637–1691), colonist, planter, government official and militiaman.